Ryan Thomas O'Callaghan (born July 19, 1983) is a former American football offensive tackle. He played college football at California and was drafted by the New England Patriots in the fifth round of the 2006 NFL Draft. He also played for the Kansas City Chiefs.

Professional career

New England Patriots
As a rookie, O'Callaghan started in his first NFL game against the Buffalo Bills in 2006 at right tackle. He would go on to start six games in 2006, as well as a game in 2007, filling in for injured starter Nick Kaczur. O'Callaghan missed the entire 2008 season after being placed on injured reserve with a shoulder injury on August 28. He was waived by the Patriots on September 5, 2009, during final cuts.

Kansas City Chiefs
O'Callaghan was picked up off waivers by the Kansas City Chiefs on September 6, 2009, after being released by New England the previous day. He started 12 games that year. The Chiefs re-signed O'Callaghan on April 15, 2010. He played in 11 games with one start.

Honors and awards
On December 20, 2014, O'Callaghan was inducted into the Shasta County Sports Hall of Fame along with several other athletes from Shasta County, California, such as Max Burch, Sam Enochian, Jeff Foster, Ricky Ray, Megan Rapinoe, Eddie Wilson, and Mark Wilson.

Personal life
O'Callaghan was raised in Redding, California. In June 2017, he came out as gay in an interview with Outsports. He shared his struggle with self-acceptance and that he had convinced himself that no one would accept him as a gay man, reconciling that he would end his life when his football career had ended. The turning point was when he came out to the Chiefs' clinical psychologist, and then later to teammates and family, who were all supportive. He now speaks openly about his struggles and coming out.

In 2019 his autobiography, My Life on the Line: How the NFL Damn Near Killed Me and Ended Up Saving My Life, was published. He started the Ryan O'Callaghan Foundation, which provides scholarships to LGBT youth.

See also
 Homosexuality in American football
 List of LGBT sportspeople

References

External links
 
Cal Bears bio
New England Patriots bio
Kansas City Chiefs bio

American football offensive tackles
American sportsmen
California Golden Bears football players
Gay sportsmen
Kansas City Chiefs players
LGBT people from California
LGBT players of American football
American LGBT sportspeople
New England Patriots players
People from Susanville, California
Players of American football from California
1983 births
Living people